The Makira leaf warbler (Phylloscopus makirensis), also known as the San Cristobal leaf-warbler, is a species of Old World warbler in the family Phylloscopidae.  It is found only in Solomon Islands.  Its natural habitats are subtropical or tropical moist lowland forests and subtropical or tropical moist montane forests.

References

Makira leaf warbler
Birds of Makira
Makira leaf warbler
Taxonomy articles created by Polbot
Taxobox binomials not recognized by IUCN